Deborah Boliver Boehm is a journalist, travel writer, editor and the former editor of Eastwest magazine. She also works as a translator. Boehm moved to Japan to attend college in Kyoto in 1970. She was a student of Japanese language and culture and wanted to continue her education. She writes horror and supernatural based in Japanese folklore while she is the translator for Kenzaburō Ōe, the winner of the 1994 Nobel Prize for Literature. She also translates for Mariko Koike who writes detective and horror fiction. Boehm now lives in Santa Fe, New Mexico.

Bibliography
Ghost of a Smile
A Zen Romance: One Woman's Adventures In A Monastery

Translations

The Tattoo Murder Case 
The Cat in the Coffin
Death by Water
The Graveyard Apartment

References and sources

Year of birth missing (living people)
Living people
American women journalists
American travel writers
American women travel writers
American horror writers
American translators
21st-century American women